Demopolis Town Square, currently officially known as Confederate Park, is a historic park in the city of Demopolis, Alabama, United States. It is one of the oldest public squares in the state. Demopolis had its beginnings in 1817 with the Vine and Olive Colony, and the park was established in 1819.  The park covers one city block, bounded by Main, Capitol, Walnut, and Washington Streets.

The park was renamed "Confederate Park" in 1923, at request of United Daughters of the Confederacy.

The park contains several historic structures, including a Victorian-era gazebo near the corner of Walnut Avenue and Washington Street, the Demopolis City Hall, built in 1869–70 as a courthouse annex, and the old Presbyterian Church, built in 1843 and now known as Rooster Hall.  The former church served as the Marengo County Courthouse from 1868 until 1871, when the county seat was temporarily moved from Linden. The park's center features a large cast iron fountain that was installed in 1895. The park is often used for the city's festivals, most notably for many of the Christmas on the River events.  The park was added to the National Register of Historic Places on 29 November 1975.

References

National Register of Historic Places in Marengo County, Alabama
Demopolis, Alabama
Greek Revival architecture in Alabama
Parks in Alabama
Protected areas of Marengo County, Alabama
Parks on the National Register of Historic Places in Alabama
United Daughters of the Confederacy monuments and memorials
1819 establishments in Alabama